John C. Hedges was an American football and baseball coach.  He served as the head football coach at Franklin & Marshall College located in Lancaster, Pennsylvania.  He held that position for the 1901 season.  His coaching record at Franklin & Marshall was 7–3–1.  While at the school, he also held the title of "Physical Director" of the college.

Prior to coaching at Franklin & Marshall, Hedges was the head coach at Lebanon Valley College, compiling a record of 3–7.  Hedges also served as the head coach at Ursinus College in 1899.

Hedges played college football at the University of Pennsylvania.

Head coaching record

Football

References

Year of birth missing
Year of death missing
19th-century players of American football
Franklin & Marshall Diplomats baseball coaches
Franklin & Marshall Diplomats football coaches
Lebanon Valley Flying Dutchmen football coaches
Penn Quakers football coaches
Penn Quakers football players
Ursinus Bears football coaches